Melchizedek II (died  1553) was the Catholicos Patriarch of Georgia in the years of  1538–1541 or in the periods of 1528-1529, 1540-1545, and 1548-1552. He was a son of King Constantine II of Kartli by his wife Tamar.

Ancestry

References 

Catholicoses and Patriarchs of Georgia (country)
16th-century Eastern Orthodox bishops
16th-century people from Georgia (country)
Bagrationi dynasty of the Kingdom of Kartli
Georgian princes
1550 deaths
Year of birth unknown